Gentle Eyes is an album by Art Farmer recorded in Austria in 1972 and originally released on the Mainstream label.

Reception

Scott Yanow of Allmusic states, "this sleepy affair with a European string section is unremittingly dull... the arrangements for the 15 strings, five horns and rhythm section are quite boring. There are many rewarding Art Farmer dates currently available, so skip this misfire".

Track listing
 "A Time for Love" (Johnny Mandel, Paul Francis Webster) – 5:22
 "Didn't We" (Jimmy Webb) – 3:07
 "Soulsides" (Erich Kleinschuster) – 4:28
 "So Are You" (Hans Salomon) – 3:36
 "Song of No Regrets" (Sergio Mendes) – 4:59
 "Gentle Rain"(Luiz Bonfá) – 4:58
 "We've Only Just Begun" (Roger Nichols, Paul Williams) – 3:17
 "God Bless the Child" (Billie Holiday, Arthur Herzog, Jr.) – 4:54
 "Gloomy Morning" (Salomon) – 5:19
 "Gentle Eyes" (Fritz Pauer) – 3:28
 "Some Other Time" (Leonard Bernstein, Betty Comden, Adolph Green) – 5:59

Personnel
Art Farmer – flugelhorn
Robert Demmer, Robert Politzer – trumpet
Garney Hicks – trombone
Hans Low – alto flute
Leszek Zadlo – soprano saxophone, tenor saxophone
Hans Salomon – alto saxophone, bass clarinet
Hans Grotzer, Toni Stricker – concertmaster
Wladi Cermac, Paul Fickl, Johann Fuchs, Herbert Heide, Erich Koritschoner, Bruno Mayr, Kurt Plaschka, Wolfgang Reichert, Walter Topf – violin
Heinz Fussganger, Bruno Schimann, Dagmar Sothje, Gerhard Zatschek – cello
Fritz Pauer – piano, electric piano
Richard Oesterreicher, Julius Scheybal – guitar
Rudolf Hansen, Jimmy Woode – bass
Erich Bachtragl – drums
Jula Koch – percussion
Stephanie – vocals
Johannes Fehring – conductor
Hans Salomon – arranger

References

Mainstream Records albums
Art Farmer albums
1972 albums
Albums produced by Bob Shad